Gabriel Migliori (November 1909 – January 1975) was a Brazilian composer, pianist, and conductor. Born in São Paulo, he had musical classes with Savino de Benedicts(pt), Armando Pugliesi, and Agostino Cantú(pt). He composed music orchestras and films as well.

Migliori's work on O Cangaceiro music earned him a special mention at the 1953 Cannes Film Festival. Nine years later, his composition for O Pagador de Promessas won the Best Musical Score at the San Francisco International Film Festival.

Selected filmography
 O Cangaceiro (1953)
 The Lero-Lero Family  (1953)
 Cidade Ameaçada (1960)
 The First Mass (1961)
 O Pagador de Promessas (1962)

References

External links

1909 births
1975 deaths
Brazilian classical pianists
Brazilian composers
Brazilian conductors (music)
Brazilian film score composers
Male film score composers
Musicians from São Paulo
20th-century conductors (music)
20th-century classical pianists
20th-century composers
20th-century male musicians
Male classical pianists